David Herman MacLennan  (July 3, 1937 - June 24, 2020) was a Canadian biochemist and geneticist known for his basic work on proteins that regulate calcium flux through the sarcoplasmic reticulum (SR), thereby regulating muscle contraction and relaxation, and for his discoveries in the field of muscle diseases caused by genetic defects in calcium regulatory proteins.

Born in Swan River, Manitoba, to Douglas MacLennan and Sigriður Sigurðardóttir, he received a BSA from the University of Manitoba in 1959 and a DSc (hc) in 2001. He received MS (1961) and PhD (1963) degrees from Purdue University under Harry Beevers, and was then a postdoctoral fellow (1963–1964) under David E. Green and an assistant professor (1964–1968) at the University of Wisconsin–Madison. In 1969, he was appointed associate professor in the Banting and Best Department of Medical Research and, later, professor (1974), chair (1978–1990), J. W. Billes Professor of Medical Research (1987–2007) and university professor (1993–2015).

MacLennan made fundamental contributions to our understanding of the mechanism of ion transport by SR calcium pumps, the storage of calcium in the SR by acidic lumenal proteins and the release of calcium from the SR by calcium release channels. He led teams that defined the genetic basis for the human skeletal muscle diseases, malignant hyperthermia, central core disease and Brody disease and was part of the team that demonstrated that mutations in phospholamban, a regulator of the calcium pump, can cause cardiomyopathy. His identification of a calcium release channel mutation that causes porcine stress syndrome resulted in a diagnostic test that has decreased the incidence of the disease dramatically, with substantial economic benefits to the swine industry.

Honours and awards
1974 Ayerst Award of the Canadian Biochemical Society
1985 Fellow of the Royal Society of Canada
1990 National Lecturer Award of the Biophysical Society
1991 Gairdner Foundation International Award
1994 Fellow of the Royal Society of London
1997 Killam Prize (Health Sciences) of the Canada Council for the Arts
2000 Royal Society Glaxo Wellcome Prize, Medal and Lecture
2001 Fellow of the International Society for Heart Research
2001 Foreign Associate of the National Academy of Sciences USA
2001 Honorary Doctor of Science, University of Manitoba
2001 Officer of the Order of Canada
2004 Honorary Member of the Japanese Biochemical Society
2009 Member of the Order of Ontario
2013 Member of the Canadian Medical Hall of Fame
2015 Foreign Honorary Member American Academy of Arts and Sciences

Notes

External links
Home Page for David MacLennan’s Laboratory
ISI Highly Cited Researchers
University of Manitoba Distinguished Graduates
Canada Council for the Arts 
Journal of Biological Chemistry 

1937 births
2020 deaths
Foreign associates of the National Academy of Sciences
Canadian medical researchers
Canadian Fellows of the Royal Society
Fellows of the Royal Society of Canada
Officers of the Order of Canada
Members of the Order of Ontario
Academic staff of the University of Toronto